Juan Carlos Lecompte Pérez is a Colombian author who was married to Ingrid Betancourt, a politician kidnapped by the Revolutionary Armed Forces of Colombia (FARC). After her public release in Operation Jaque they divorced. In January 2010 he published a book about their break-up, it is called "Ingrid et moi".

References

External links
The Kidnapping of Ingrid Betancourt - documentary film

1959 births
Living people
People from Cartagena, Colombia
Colombian people of French descent
Colombian male writers